The American Association of Foreign Language Newspapers was founded by Louis Nicholas Hammerling in 1908. It served as an intermediary between "respectable national advertisers", and the foreign-language newspapers that profited from publishing advertisements. Frances Kellor led the effort after Hammerling's patriotism came under question ca.1918. Critics included Robert Ezra Park.

References

Further reading
  v.1 (1912)

Organizations established in 1908
1908 establishments in the United States
Professional associations based in the United States
Non-English-language newspapers published in the United States